K. Pitchandi, also known as  K. Pichandi, is an Indian Tamil politician and the current Deputy Speaker of Tamil Nadu Legislative Assembly.A.K.Aranganathan only who defeted K.pitchandi in 2011.K.pichandi continues record was broken in 2011 - 2016.

Politics 
Pitchandi was elected to the Tamil Nadu legislative assembly from Tiruvannamalai constituency as a Dravida Munnetra Kazhagam (DMK) candidate in the 1989, 1996, 2001 and 2006 elections. He also contested the constituency in the 1991 elections, when he finished as runner-up to V. Kannan of the Indian National Congress.

Pitchandi was the Minister for Housing and Urban Development in the Tamil Nadu Cabinet from 1996 to 2001. He stood as a candidate in 2011 in the Kilpennathur constituency, where he finished as runner-up to A. K. Aranganathan of the All India Anna Dravida Munnetra Kazhagam (AIADMK) party.

Pitchandi remained loyal to the DMK party, for which he was rewarded with the mostly honorific position of deputy whip in May 2016. He had won the Kilpennathur seat in the elections of 2021 to become MLA once again, after which he was made the Deputy Speaker of the Tamil Nadu Legislative Assembly.

Pitchandi was instrumental in persuading E. V. Velu to transfer his allegiance to the DMK from the AIADMK. Velu, who had already served twice as an AIADMK MLA, was elected to Pitchandi's former seat in Tiruvannamalai as a DMK member from 2011.

Personal life 
On 13 September 2019, his daughter Aishwarya married Arumainayagam (alias Anbu), the son of late Tamil actor Mayilsamy

References 

Living people
Dravida Munnetra Kazhagam politicians
Tamil Nadu MLAs 1996–2001
Tamil Nadu MLAs 2001–2006
Tamil Nadu MLAs 2006–2011
State cabinet ministers of Tamil Nadu
Tamil Nadu MLAs 2016–2021
Tamil Nadu MLAs 2021–2026
Deputy Speakers of the Tamil Nadu Legislative Assembly
Year of birth missing (living people)